Laments for Josiah is the term used in reference to . The passage reads: "And Jeremiah lamented for Josiah: and all the singing men and the singing women spake of Josiah in their lamentations to this day, and made them an ordinance in Israel: and, behold, they are written in the lamentations." 

This source, as described by the Chronicler, should not be confused with the canonical Book of Lamentations.  The same event is retold in 1 Esdras 1:32, although it lacks any reference to writing, or the recording of the lamentation.  Nevertheless, the dirges referred to in 2 Chronicles and 1 Esdras, as well as Lamentations may refer to a larger corpus of laments that once existed in the temple or palace archives of ancient Jerusalem.

See also 
 Table of books of Judeo-Christian Scripture

External links 
Jeremiah's Lament for Josiah
Myers, Jacob  II Chronicles: A New Translation with Introduction and Commentary.  Anchor Bible 13.  Doubleday; Garden City, 1965

Lost Jewish texts